The electronics industry is the economic sector that produces electronic devices. It emerged in the 20th century and is today one of the largest global industries. Contemporary society uses a vast array of electronic devices built-in automated or semi-automated factories operated by the industry. Products are primarily assembled from metal–oxide–semiconductor (MOS) transistors and integrated circuits, the latter principally by photolithography and often on printed circuit boards.

The industry's size, the use of toxic materials, and the difficulty of recycling have led to a series of problems with electronic waste. International regulation and environmental legislation have been developed to address the issues.

The electronics industry consists of various sectors.

History 

The electric power industry began in the 19th century, which led to the development of inventions such as gramaphones, radio transmitters, receivers and television. The vacuum tube was used for early electronic devices, before later being largely supplanted by semiconductor components as the fundamental technology of the industry.

The first working transistor, a point-contact transistor, was invented by John Bardeen and Walter Houser Brattain at Bell Laboratories in 1947, which led to significant research in the field of solid-state semiconductors during the 1950s. This led to the emergence of the home entertainment consumer electronics industry starting in the 1950s, largely due to the efforts of Tokyo Tsushin Kogyo (now Sony) in successfully commercializing transistor technology for a mass market, with affordable transistor radios and then transistorized television sets.

The industry employs large numbers of electronics engineers and electronics technicians to design, develop, test, manufacture, install, and repair electrical and electronic equipment such as communication equipment, medical monitoring devices, navigational equipment, and computers. Common parts manufactured are connectors, system components, cell systems, and computer accessories, and these are made of alloy steel, copper, brass, stainless steel, plastic, steel tubing, and other materials.

Consumer electronics 

Consumer electronics are products intended for everyday use, most often in entertainment, communications and office productivity.  Radio broadcasting in the early 20th century brought the first major consumer product, the broadcast receiver.  Later products include personal computers, telephones, MP3 players, cell phones, smart phones, audio equipment, televisions, calculators, GPS automotive electronics, digital cameras and players and recorders using video media such as DVDs, VCRs or camcorders. Increasingly these products have become based on digital technologies, and have largely merged with the computer industry in what is increasingly referred to as the consumerization of information technology.

Global annual consumer electronic sales are expected to reach  by 2020.

Effects on the environment 
Electrical waste contains hazardous, valuable, and scarce materials, and up to 60 elements can be found in complex electronics.
The United States and China are the world leaders in producing electronic waste, each tossing away about 3 million tons each year.   China also remains a major e-waste dumping ground for developed countries. The UNEP estimate that the amount of e-waste being produced – including mobile phones and computers – could rise by as much as 500 percent over the next decade in some developing countries, such as India. 

Increasing environmental awareness has led to changes in electronics design to reduce or eliminate toxic materials and reduce energy consumption. The Restriction of Hazardous Substances Directive (RoHS) and Waste Electrical and Electronic Equipment Directive (WEEE) were released by the European Commission in 2002.

Manufacturing

Largest electronics industry sectors

See also 
 Consumer electronics
 Electronic engineering
 Electronics
 Microelectronics
 MOSFET
 Integrated circuit
 Nanoelectronics
 Power electronics
 Semiconductor
 Silicon
 Technology

Notes

References

External links

 Joint Electron Device Engineering Council (JEDEC)
 Electronic Industry Citizenship Coalition
 Global Electronics Industry: Poster Child of 21st Century Sweatshops and Despoiler of the Environment?, Garrett Brown

 
20th-century introductions
Industries (economics)